The American Association of Suicidology (AAS) is a 501(c)(3) nonprofit organization which advocates for suicide prevention. It was established in 1968 by Edwin S. Shneidman, who has been called "a pioneer in suicide prevention." Its official journal is Suicide and Life-Threatening Behavior, published six times a year by Wiley-Blackwell.

About 
The American Association of Suicidology encourages further study in the field of suicidology by clinicians as well as the general public. The AAS states their mission is to encompass advanced study into suicidology as a field of science, educate the public in efforts to reduce the number of suicides worldwide, analyze and break down suicidal behaviors, and promote further research and training in the growing field of suicidology. The AAS hosts a campaign for both National Suicide Prevention Month and Week as well as public awareness campaigns to introduce new research and preventative measures for people who are currently dealing or have dealt with suicidal thoughts and behaviors. The AAS offers handbooks for suicide loss survivors and their friends and families to promote healing and a better understanding of suicidal triggers and causes.

Science 
Suicidology is the study of suicidal behaviors, risk factors of those behaviors, and suicide prevention. Suicidology combines both psychology and sociology to analyze the causes of suicidal behaviors and effective prevention methods.

Risk factors 
Research has pointed towards hopelessness, impulsivity, social isolation, and exposure to violence as strong risk factors surrounding suicide.

Support groups 
The Annual Healing After Suicide Loss Conference and the Survivors of Suicide are support groups that work to combat the risk factors of suicide through the emphasis on social interaction and interpersonal relationships. Educational programs and suicide specific skills and knowledge have proven effective in the treatment of suicidal patients.

Membership 
Membership of the AAS includes but is not limited to survivors of suicide loss, suicide attempt survivors, impacted friends and family, students, mental and public health professionals, researchers, suicide preventionists, interventionist and crisis intervention centers, and anyone else interested in suicide prevention. There are four membership categories.

Programs 
The AAS currently offers four different types of suicide prevention programs.

Survivors of Suicide 
The Survivors of Suicide program aims at helping suicide loss survivors connect with one another and share their experiences in a group setting.

Training and accreditation 
Training and Accreditation programs focus on utilizing techniques and skills to eliminate suicidal behaviors. Mental health professionals, school and youth personnel, and crisis workers primarily make up this program.

Conferences 
The annual American Association of Suicidology conference is a three-day event in April where private individuals, professionals, and organizations gather to collaborate, critically analyze, and network to advance the mission of building lives worth living and preventing suicide. The 2020 conference (#AAS20), in response to the COVID-19 pandemic, was the first virtual conference in the organization's history. AAS received MeetingNet's 2020 Changemaker Award for their conference focus on diversity, equity and inclusion and "keeping that momentum across the virtual medium".

National Center for the Prevention of Youth Suicide 
The National Center for the Prevention of Youth Suicide includes a Youth Advisory Board that provides insight on projects aimed at suicide prevention and reaching its adolescent demographic. In 2022, Amelia Lehto was named Director after former COO and Director, Amy Kulp, left the organization.

Statistics

Training 
Research points to a severe lack of training in suicide prevention within many fields of psychology and social work. Numbers from a national survey reported fewer than 25% of social workers having been trained in suicide prevention. The AAS is determined to prevent inadequately trained social workers and mental health professionals from working with potentially suicidal patients who display suicidal risk factors. The AAS believes promoting research and effective training—not only for mental health professionals and social workers, but also for the general public—will help prevent inadequate treatment by those in the fields of psychology and social work.

Plans for the future 
The AAS plans to spread suicidology as a field of scientific study and strives to reduce the number of suicide cases through research and analysis. In efforts to improve the field of suicidology, the International Academy for Suicide Research launched a task force to combat suicidal behaviors, causes, and risk factors to come up with better solutions and prevention programs.

See also 
 National Alliance on Mental Illness
 Canadian Association for Suicide Prevention
 International Association for Suicide Prevention

References

External links 
 

Suicide prevention
Charities based in Washington, D.C.
Psychology organizations based in the United States
Mental health organizations in Washington, D.C.
1968 establishments in Washington, D.C.
Organizations established in 1968